Bredahl is a surname. Notable people with this surname include:

Jimmi Bredahl
 of Hatesphere
Johnny Bredahl
Thomas Bredahl
Charlotte Bredahl
Ole Bredahl of Sir Henry and his Butlers

See also

Brodahl
Brodal
Bredal